León Cortés Castro is a canton in the San José province of Costa Rica. The head city of the canton is San Pablo.

It is part of Los Santos Zone, together with Dota and Tarrazú.

Toponymy 
It is named in honor of former President León Cortés Castro of Costa Rica.

History 
León Cortés Castro was created on 12 June 1962 by decree 11.

The Supreme Elections Tribunal of Costa Rica in a resolution of March 29, 1962, proclaimed the results of a plebiscite in the previous month that created the canton. An executive decree on June 12 delineated the portions of the surrounding cantons of Aserrí, Tarrazú, Dota and Desamparados that were to be included in the new canton.

Geography 
León Cortés Castro has an area of  km² and a mean elevation of  metres.

The Delicias creek and the Pirrís river form major portions of the western and southern boundary, and the Tarrazú river establishes the northern and eastern limits of the canton.

Districts 
The canton of León Cortés Castro is subdivided into the following districts:
 San Pablo
 San Andrés
 Llano Bonito
 San Isidro
 Santa Cruz
 San Antonio

Demographics 

For the 2011 census, León Cortés Castro had a population of  inhabitants.

Transportation

Road transportation 
The canton is covered by the following road routes:

References 

Cantons of San José Province
Populated places in San José Province